Arctic Song is a Canadian animated short film, directed by Germaine Arnattaujuq, Neil Christopher and Louise Flaherty and released in 2022. The film illustrates the traditional creation myth in Inuit culture, depicting the creation of the land, the sea and the sky.

The film premiered in February 2022 at the Available Light Film Festival.

The film was a Canadian Screen Award nominee for Best Animated Short at the 11th Canadian Screen Awards in 2023.

References

2022 animated films
2022 films
2020s animated short films
National Film Board of Canada animated short films
2022 short films
Canadian animated short films
Inuit films
2020s Canadian films